Tim McCreadie (born April 12, 1974) is an American Dirt Late Model racing driver. He is the 2021 and 2022 Lucas Oil Late Model Dirt Series Champion.  In 2007 he ran a partial schedule in NASCAR West Series, ARCA RE/MAX Series, NASCAR Busch Series, and World of Outlaws Late Model Series.

Racing career

As a youth, McCreadie raced go karts in the Thousand Island region of New York, and advanced to small block modifieds. McCreadie was 59-time DIRT Big-Block feature winner prior to moving on to the Late Models.  McCreadie was voted the 2006 Al Holbert Memorial National Driver of the Year by the Eastern Motorsport Press Association.

McCreadie won the 2006 Chili Bowl as well as the 2006 World of Outlaws Late Model Series Championship. McCreadie signed a development deal with Richard Childress Racing in 2007, racing six events in the NASCAR Nationwide Series. He earned top-15s at Gateway International Raceway and O'Reilly Raceway Park as was thought by many to be one of the next up-and-comers in the sport. He tested the RCR NNS car at Daytona International Speedway and topped the speed charts early on. Despite these successes, however, sponsorship could not be found for his team and he and Richard Childress Racing agreed to part ways. 

In 2008, McCreadie won the Topless 100 Late Model Race, leading all 100 laps. On September 27, 2008, he won the best race of his career the 5th Annual Late Model Knoxville Nationals, taking home a whopping $40,000.  The 2008 season also saw him earn a win at the Jackson 100, beating some of the biggest name in the sport of auto racing, as well as trying his hand in the commentary booth as an analyst for Speed TV for the Rite Aid 200 at the Syracuse Mile.
In January 2009 McCreadie severely injured his back at the 2009 Chili Bowl race after a serious midget car roll over. Tim broke one vertebra, has floating pieces in his back. He resumed racing in 2010.

In 2013, McCreadie won the "USA Nationals" at the Cedar Lake Speedway in New Richmond, Wisconsin worth $50,000.

In 2014, McCreadie won the "Prairie Dirt Classic" at the Fairbury American Legion Speedway in Fairbury, Illinois worth $25,000.

In 2016, McCreadie joined the Lucas Oil Late Model Dirt Series full-time for the first time in his career.

In 2017, McCreadie won the "Silver Dollar Nationals" at the I-80 Speedway in Greenwood, Nebraska worth $53,000. He also won the "North-South 100" at the Florence Speedway in Union, Kentucky worth $50,000.

In 2018, McCreadie became the first driver from New York state to win the World 100.

In 2019, McCreadie won the Firecracker 100 at the Lernerville Speedway in Sarver, PA driving the K&L Rumley Enterprises #6 Longhorn Chassis.
In 2022 he won the Firecracker 100 again for the second time.

Family
Tim is the son of Bob and Sandy McCreadie, and has two siblings, Tyne and Jordan.  His father is the legendary modified driver "Barefoot" Bob McCreadie, an inductee to the Lowe's Motor Speedway Walk of Fame, the Dirt Motorsports Northeast Hall of Fame, and the Eastern Motorsport Press Association Hall of Fame. Tim McCreadie's nickname is "T-Mac".

Motorsports career results

NASCAR
(key) (Bold – Pole position awarded by qualifying time. Italics – Pole position earned by points standings or practice time. * – Most laps led.)

Busch Series

Busch East Series

Camping World Series West

ARCA Re/Max Series
(key) (Bold – Pole position awarded by qualifying time. Italics – Pole position earned by points standings or practice time. * – Most laps led.)

References

External links
 
 

Living people
1974 births
Sportspeople from Watertown, New York
Racing drivers from New York (state)
ARCA Menards Series drivers
NASCAR drivers
Richard Childress Racing drivers